Gavyn Wright is a British violinist and orchestra leader with the London Session Orchestra and Penguin Cafe Orchestra.

He is best known for his orchestral arrangements on pop productions (including Elton John, Simply Red, Bush, Mecano, Oasis, Gordon Haskell, Donna Lewis, Tina Turner, Italian singer-songwriter Alice, Lucio Battisti, Van Morrison) as well as numerous TV and movie soundtracks (including Shrek 1 and 2, The Constant Gardener, Stuart Little, Batman Begins, The Black Dahlia, Shakespeare in Love, 12 Monkeys, The Last Emperor, We Were Soldiers, Shall We Dance?).

External links
Discography at Discogs
Filmography at the New York Times

British classical violinists
British male violinists
British classical violists
Living people
Year of birth missing (living people)
21st-century classical violinists
21st-century British male musicians
Penguin Cafe Orchestra members
Male classical violinists
21st-century violists